Norbert Beuls (13 January 1957 – 19 February 2014) was a Belgian footballer and football manager.

Club career
He came through the youth ranks at hometown club Rapid Spouwen and joined Tongeren in 1977. After a season on loan at FC Antwerp he moved to Charleroi in 1985 before fe finished his career at Racing Genk.

Managerial career
Beuls was manager of Genk alongside Pierre Denier and also coached Spouwen-Mopertingen and Patro Eisden with whom he won promotion to the Belgian Third Division in 2011. He returned to Spouwen in 2014 but suddenly died on 19 February 2014.

Personal life
Beuls was married and had 4 sons.

References

External links
 Profile - FC Antwerp

1957 births
2014 deaths
People from Bilzen
Association football defenders
Belgian footballers
Royal Antwerp F.C. players
R. Charleroi S.C. players
K.R.C. Genk players
Belgian Pro League players
Belgian football managers
Footballers from Limburg (Belgium)